I'm Waiting for You is a 1952 West German drama film directed by Volker von Collande and starring Hanna Rucker, Joachim Brennecke and Anne-Marie Blanc. It was shot at Göttingen Studios and on location around Sylt in Schleswig-Holstein.

Cast
 Hanna Rucker as Barbara
 Joachim Brennecke as Peter Anweiler
 Anne-Marie Blanc as Frau Dr. Helm
 Volker von Collande as Kinderarzt Dr. Born
 Käthe Haack as Direktorin
 Ida Wüst as Tante Olga
 Petra Unkel as Ursel Born
 Annelies Schmiedel as Fräulein Schuster
 Hubert von Meyerinck as Studienrat Schwarze
 Willy Maertens as Hausmeister Wagner
 Irene Nathusius as Äpfelchen
 Xenia Pörtner as Gabriele
 Liliane Yvernault as Arlette
 Gudrun Thielemann as Garbo
 Gabriele Mascher as Holzwurm
 Maya Levare as Maya

References

Bibliography 
 Parish, Robert. Film Actors Guide. Scarecrow Press, 1977.

External links 
 

1952 films
1952 drama films
German drama films
West German films
1950s German-language films
Films directed by Volker von Collande
German black-and-white films
1950s German films
Films shot at Göttingen Studios